Allama Delwar Hossain Sayeedi is a Bangladeshi Islamic scholar, former politician and lecturer, who served as a Member of Parliament representing the Pirojpur-1, Barisal, constituency during 1996–2006.

He has been arrested in 2013, after which massive protests against the Bangladeshi government rapidly spread across Egypt, UK, Italy and other countries. The newly established International Crimes Tribunal of Bangladesh sentenced him to death in February 2013 for founding him guilty of eight out of twenty alleged charges regarding the Bangladesh Liberation War. His alleged crimes included passing secret information to the Pakistani Army, genocide of Hindus and arson of their properties, however the Bangladesh Nationalist Party denied his charges and described it as a "political vendetta" and the former Prime Minister Khaleda Zia has called the tribunal a farce. The Human Rights Watch also criticised the conducts and said that the newly made tribunal falls short of international standards.

Several other international observers condemned the verdict and suggested the charges to be politically motivated. The authorities have been accused of preventing key witnesses from testifying and bringing intentionally false witnessess. It has been also argued that he was deliberately mistaken with "Delwar Hossain Shikdar", an individual that was executed during the war.  In September 2014 the Supreme Court commuted his sentence to life imprisonment. The Amnesty International questioned the legitimacy of both tribunal and judgement due to insufficient evidences provided and for political grudges against Sayeedi and his party as an aftermath to Sayeedi's critical comments of the Prime Minister of Bangladesh and her policies.

Early life
Sayeedi received his first primary religious education at his local village madrassa, which was built by his father. Sayeedi attended the Sarsina Alia Madrasah in 1962, followed by the Khulna Alia Madrasah.

Bangladesh Liberation War
Longstanding tensions between West Pakistan and East Pakistan gave rise in 1971 to the Bangladesh Liberation War. The ruling Pakistani elite, consisting of Punjabis and Pathans, thought that the Bengalis were inferior. The straw that broke the camel's back was the imposition of Urdu as the state language of Pakistan, a move that angered the already upset Bengali people. On 25 March 1971 Pakistan military started armed operation on unarmed Bengali people and killed hundreds of them in that night and the atrocities have been referred to as acts of genocide. The Pakistani Army along with Bihari Muslim migrants from India (Razakars who were hand in glove with Sayeedi and others like him) unleashed war crimes on the Bengali population. Post-independence, many such Bihari's now live in exile in Bangladesh while continuously seeking repatriation with (West) Pakistan.

His defence at the ICT trials, however, have alleged that this was a case of mistaken identity saying that Delwar Hossain Shikdar had been apprehended and executed by freedom fighters after the war. Before this, in the case of war criminal Abdul Quader Molla, who is also a leader of Bangladesh Jamaat-e-Islami, the same defence alleged that Quader Molla and 'Koshai' Quader or 'Butcher' Quader were not the same person. In both cases as shown here, the defence for lack of better evidence tried to work with the only recourse available to it; alternate names or aliases were the core arguments for the defence.

Political career
Having gained recognition, he was elected as a member of parliament for constituency Pirojpur-1 in the 1996 and 2001 national elections of Bangladesh.

Foreign travel controversy
In 2004, the United States of America Terrorist Screening Center (TSC) added Sayeedi to its No Fly List, established to prevent suspected radicals and terrorists from flying into the US. In July 2006 Sayeedi travelled to the UK to address rallies in London and Luton; his entry was cleared by the foreign office. Many British MPs considered his admission to the country to be controversial. In leaked emails reported by The Times, an adviser, Eric Taylor, said that Sayeedi's "previous visits to the UK have been reportedly marred by violence caused by his supporters."

On 13 July 2006, the British journalist Martin Bright released a documentary called Who Speaks For Muslims? It included Sayeedi and identified him as having extreme views. Sayeedi has a large following within the British Bangladeshi community. He was invited to speak at the East London Mosque on 14 July 2006; the then-secretary general of the Muslim Council of Britain, Muhammad Abdul Bari, supported his invitation.

Government investigation of war crimes during liberation war
On 22 March 2012, the Bangladesh government established the International Crimes Tribunal (Bangladesh) to hear cases resulting from investigations of war crimes during the struggle for independence. It was an effort to "provide justice for victims of atrocities in the 1971 war of independence." There had been longstanding accounts of abuses during the war, including forced conversion of Hindus to Islam, sectarian attacks on minority Hindu communities, raping of women, and attacks on unarmed civilians, among the excesses.
On 24 July 2009, immigration officials at Zia International Airport prevented Sayeedi from going abroad. He challenged the Government's restriction by filing a writ petition with the High Court on 27 July. The Attorney General stated before the Chamber Judge that Mawlana Sayeedi had opposed the independence of Bangladesh in 1971. He argued that if Sayeedi was not barred from foreign travel, he might work against the government's efforts to bring justice for war crimes during that conflict.
Human Rights Watch in November 2011 criticised the conduct of the ICT, suggesting that it has not provided enough protection for the defense of the accused. It has said that "lawyers representing the accused before the ICT have reported being harassed by state officials and threatened with arrests."  Several witnesses and an investigator working for the defense have also reported harassment by police and threats for cooperating with the defense."
"Human Rights Watch has long called for the ICT to establish an effective victim and witness program which would ensure protection for both prosecution and defense witnesses. Changes to the ICT rules in June 2011, which authorized the tribunal to ensure the physical well-being of victims and witnesses, were a welcome improvement, but did not go far enough, Human Rights Watch said."

War crimes trials

Charge-sheets
On 12 August 2009, Manik Poshari filed a war crime case in Pirojpur against Sayeedi and four others. His accusations dated to events during the 1971 Bangladeshi war of independence.

Mahbubul Alam Howladar, a former freedom fighter, and now a member and deputy commander of the freedom fighters association called Zianagor upazila Muktijoddha Sangsad, filed charges against Sayeedi with the Pirojpur senior judicial magistrate's court in Zianagar.

The war crime trials of Sayeedi began on 20 November 2011 at the International Crimes Tribunal in Bangladesh. The tribunal charged him with twenty counts of crimes against humanity, including murder, rape and arson, during the liberation war. Some of the charges are
(a) passing secret information on the gathering of people behind the Madhya Masimpur bus-stand to the Pakistan Army, and leading the Army there, where 20 unnamed people were killed by shooting;
(b) abducting and killing of government officials (deputy magistrate – Saif Mizanur Rahman, sub-divisional police officer – Foyezur Rahman Ahmed, and sub-divisional officer – Abdur Razzak) of Pirojpur;
(c) identifying and looting the houses and shops of people belonging to the Awami League, Hindu community, and supporters of the Liberation War at Parerhat Bazar under Pirojpur Sadar;
(d) leading an operation, accompanied by Pakistan Army, to burn 25 houses of the Hindu community at Umedpur village (under the jurisdiction of Indurkani Police Station);
(e) leading the group who abducted three women from the house of Gouranga Saha of Parerhat Bandar and handed them over to the Pakistan army for raping.

Sultan Ahmed Howlader, the fourth prosecution witness in the trial, testified that, during the liberation war, Sayeedi and his associate Moshleuddin confined Bipod Shaha's daughter Vanu Shaha at Parerhat, Pirojpur district and regularly raped her. Another witness testified that Sayeedi had organised the Razakar militia, a paramilitary force that aided the Pakistan army at Pirojpur.

The trial saw 28 witnesses for the prosecution and 16 for the defence. In addition, the tribunal received 16 witness statements given to the investigator after the prosecution argued that those witnesses were either dead, or that producing them before the tribunal would incur unreasonable delay or expenditure.

Controversies
On 5 November 2012, Sukhranjan Bali, a prosecution witness who instead testified as a defense witness, was abducted outside the International Crimes Tribunal allegedly by the Bangladesh Police. Human rights group believed it to be a case of forced disappearance. Later, Bali was handed over to India's Border Security Force. "The apparent abduction of a witness in a trial at the ICT is a cause for serious concern about the conduct of the prosecution, judges and government," said a spokesperson for Human Rights Watch. Bali had been expected to counter prosecution allegations about Sayeedi's involvement in the 1971 murder of Bali's brother. Several audio recordings were surfaced reveiling Sayeedi's extra marital affairs.

Conviction
The tribunal found Sayeedi guilty in 8 of the 20 charges, including mass killing, rape, arson, loot and force minority Hindus to convert to Islam during 1971. On 28 February 2013, the tribunal sentenced him to death by hanging for two charges among the eight committed during the Liberation War of Bangladesh in 1971.

As per the verdict, Sayeedi was awarded capital punishment for the offenses as listed in charge Nos. 8 and 10. The court refrained from passing any separate sentence of imprisonment for the offences listed in charges Nos.6,7,11,14,16 and 19 which it said had been proved beyond a reasonable doubt. At the same time, the accused was found not guilty to the offenses of crimes against humanity as listed in charges nos. 1,2,3,4,5,9,12,13,15,17,18 and 20 and was acquitted from the said charges.

The Economist criticised the trial, stating that the presiding judge had resigned and Sayeedi's death sentence was handed down by three men who had not heard all the witnesses.
The trial was supported by European Union.

The defendant's lawyers boycotted the trial and have said that the charges against Sayeedi and others were politically motivated.

Reactions
Sayeedi said the verdict was not neutral. The lack of evidence provided in the trial as well as the potential for political motivations for Sayeedi's arrest and conviction has led to rights groups like Amnesty International to question the legitimacy of the tribunal and conviction.

By afternoon on the day of the protest, clashes had erupted across Bangladesh between Islamic activists and police forces. An estimated 100 protesters died countrywide.
According to the BBC, it marked "The worst day of political violence in Bangladesh in decades".

Verdict of the appeal
On 17 September 2014, the Appellate Division of the Bangladesh Supreme Court reduced the sentence of Sayeedi from the death penalty to 'imprisonment till death' for war crimes against Bengali people in Bangladesh Liberation War in 1971.

Personal life
Sayeedi is fluent in Bengali, Urdu and Arabic.

Selected published books

 Biography of the Hereafter
 The principle of building a corruption free society
 Demands and relevant ideas for banning religion-based politics
 Why I join Jamaat-e-Islami?
 Islam to suppress terrorism and militancy
 Baby training methods 
 Prayers of the Prophet (S.M)
 Why Qadianis are not Muslims
 The miracle of the Holy Qur'an
 In the land of the blue sea
 My duty on my family
 Open letter 
 The easy process of gaining paradise
 The ordeal of faith
 Social life in the light of Hadith

References

Living people
People from Pirojpur District
Bangladeshi Sunni Muslims
Bangladesh Jamaat-e-Islami politicians
7th Jatiya Sangsad members
8th Jatiya Sangsad members
Bangladeshi people convicted of war crimes
Bangladeshi politicians convicted of crimes
Bangladeshi male criminals
Prisoners and detainees of Bangladesh
Year of birth missing (living people)
Bengali Muslim scholars of Islam
Bangladeshi Sunni Muslim scholars of Islam
21st-century Bengalis
20th-century Bengalis